The Carmelite Missionaries  (Spanish: Carmelitas Misioneras; Latin: Missionarii Monte Carmelo; abbreviation: C.M.) is a religious institute of pontifical right in the Catholic Church founded by Francisco Palau

Catholic missionary orders
Carmelites
Religious organisations based in Italy

ca:Germanes Carmelites Missioneres
es:Carmelitas Misioneras
fr:Carmélites missionnaires
it:Suore carmelitane missionarie
ru:Кармелитки-миссионерки